Claude Albert Mbourounot is a Gabonese football manager.  He is currently in charge  of the Gabon national under-23 football team. In 2011, he led the under-23 side in winning the 2011 CAF U-23 Championship, thus qualifying Gabon for the 2012 Summer Olympics in London. It will be the nation's very first appearance.

Besides fulfilling his role as the under-23 coach, Mbourounot is also a technical director for the Gabonese Football Federation. Mbourounot had previously coached the Gabon senior team in 2003.

Honours
Gabon U23
 CAF U-23 Championship: 2011

References

External links
 

20th-century births
Living people
Gabonese football managers
Gabon national football team managers
1961 births
21st-century Gabonese people